Paul Fisher is an American modelling agent. He has represented Naomi Campbell, Carol Alt, and Stephanie Seymour. He hosts Remodeled on The CW Television Network, and the Dutch TV series I Can Make You A Supermodel on channel RTL5.

In 1987, Fisher founded It Models in a complex in Hollywood's Photo District with friend and business associate Omar Albertto, (who ran the Men's Division, Omar's Men) backed by renowned Model Agent/Supermodel Louise Despointes who also owned Name in NYC and City in Paris at the time she backed Paul and Omar. Together, the three began a very influential, lucrative run in the fashion industry. According to the LA Times, the agencies's combined gross revenue was over $15,000,000 annually.

References

Living people
Year of birth missing (living people)
American television hosts